Piotrówka may refer to:
Polish name for the Petrůvka River, mainly in the Czech Republic
Piotrówka, Subcarpathian Voivodeship (south-east Poland)
Piotrówka, Greater Poland Voivodeship (west-central Poland)
Piotrówka, Opole Voivodeship (south-west Poland)
Piotrówka, Warmian-Masurian Voivodeship (north Poland)